Redding is an English surname, derived from the town of Reading. At the time the 1881 British Census was enumerated, the frequency of the surname Redding was highest in Buckinghamshire (12.8 times the national average), followed by Huntingdonshire, Worcestershire, Herefordshire, Cambridgeshire, Warwickshire, Anglesey, Bedfordshire and Rutland.

List of persons with the surname
Ann Holmes Redding (born 1952), former Episcopal priest who was defrocked in 2009 for converting to Islam years earlier
Benjamin B. Redding (1824–1882), Canadian-born California politician
Cory Redding (born 1980), American football player
Cyrus Redding (1785–1870), British journalist and wine writer
Devine Redding (born 1996), American football player
Dick Redding (1890–1948), American baseball player
Gene Redding (born 1945), American singer
George Redding (1900–1974), Canadian ice hockey player
Jheri Redding (1907–1998), American hair care entrepreneur
Louis L. Redding (1901–1998), American civil rights advocate
Noel Redding (1945–2003), English musician
Oscar Redding (born c. 1974), Australian actor and director
Otis Redding (1941–1967), American soul singer
Phil Redding (1890–1928), American baseball player
Reggie Redding (born 1988), American basketball player
Reggie Redding (American football) (born 1968), American football player
Rob Redding (born 1976), American commentator
Scott Redding (born 1993), English Grand Prix motorcycle racer
Teo Redding (born 1994), American football player
Tim Redding (born 1978), American baseball player

Fictional characters
Ellis Boyd "Red" Redding, character in The Shawshank Redemption
Burr Redding, inmate on TV's Oz
William Redding, character in the Splinter Cell series of video games and novels
Blake Redding played by Logan Paul in a 2016 YouTube Originals movie The Thinning

See also
Redding (disambiguation)
Charles Redding Pitt (born 1944), American attorney and former chairman of the Alabama Democratic Party
Francis Redding Tillou Nicholls (1834–1912), American attorney, politician, judge and brigadier general in the Confederate States Army
Sidney Redding Mason (1925-2009), American businessman and politician
The Reddings, funk, soul and disco band, with Dexter Redding and Otis Redding III, both sons of Otis Redding
The Redding Brothers, indie rock trio, comprising Gabriel, Josiah and Micah Redding

References

External links 
Redding Surname Meaning at the Internet Surname Database

English-language surnames